The city of Miami, Florida in the United States is a popular location for the filming and setting of movies and television shows, both fictional and non-fictional. The following article provides a list of films and television shows which have been partially or wholly set in or shot in Miami. The listed shows span a wide variety of genres and range from shows almost entirely shot and set in the city (e.g., The Golden Girls and Miami Vice) to those containing only a small number of scenes shot or set in Miami (e.g., Lost and Thunderball (1965)).

Context
Because of its climate and the high sunshine amounts, Florida has long been a favoured location for filmmakers, and the early silent film industry in the state rivaled Hollywood's in production. Film in Florida is still a major industry in the state, with Florida ranking third in the U.S. for film production (after California and New York, respectively) based on revenue generated (according to 2006 Florida Film Commission Data). In particular, Miami has long been a popular filming location in Florida and continues to grow as the entertainment industry expands throughout the state.

Worldwide, Miami is one of the largest production and distribution centers for commercial advertising, film, music, new media, still photography, and television industries. The film industry's combined economic impact in the local economy is about two billion dollars annually, with $100 to $150 million coming from more than 1,000 location filming shoots each year. There are approximately 3,000 companies working in film and entertainment in Miami-Dade County, employing an estimated 15,000 workers.

Spanish-language productions

Miami's large Hispanic population and close proximity to Latin America have made Miami a center for Latin television and film production. As a result, many Spanish-language programs are filmed in Miami's numerous television production studios, predominantly in Hialeah and Doral. These include game shows, news programs, reality shows, telenovelas, and variety shows.

Films set in or shot in Miami

English-language films set in or shot in Miami

Spanish-language films set in or shot in Miami

Television series set in or shot in Miami

English-language television series set in or shot in Miami

Spanish-language television series set in or shot in Miami

Awards shows hosted in Miami
In keeping with its modern music tradition, the city has hosted a number of music awards shows:
Latin Grammys (2003) (2011)
Lo Nuestro Awards (Since 1989)
MTV Video Music Awards (2004 and 2005)

See also
Film in Miami
Cinema of Florida

References

External links
www.filmiami.org
greenwichstudios.com

 
Lists of films by setting
Lists of television series by setting
 
Films
Miami-related lists
Lists of films and television series